Puzhikkadakan is a 2019 Indian Malayalam-language romantic drama directed by newcome  Gireesh Nair and starring Chemban Vinod Jose and Dhanya Balakrishna in lead roles.

Cast 
Chemban Vinod Jose as Samuel
Dhanya Balakrishna as Anna
Jayasurya as a district collector
Maala Parvathy as Thresyamma, Samuel's mother
Alencier Ley Lopez as Koshy
Sudhi Koppa as O. Santhan
Balu Varghese as Sebastian / Seban
Aswathy Sreekanth as TV presenter
Gokulan as Manoj

Production 

The movie is based on real life events. Chemban Vinod Jose plays the lead character of an army sergeant while Dhanya Balakrishna and Mala Parvathy play his wife and mother, respectively. Jayasurya plays the role of a collector in the film and his role is based on Sriram Venkitaraman.
The trailer release in November and generated publicity due to its satire. The movie discusses the degrading quality of some of India's roads. The film released on 29 November.

Soundtrack 
The music was composed by Ranjith Meleppat, Ajay Joseph, and Bijibal. Meleppat composed three songs while Ajay Joseph and Bijibal each composed one song, respectively.

Note: all songs are composed by Ranjith Meleppat, except where indicated.

Release 
The Times of India gave the film a rating of three out of five stars and wrote that "The film tackles the relevant topic emotionally and is sure to make the audience think, especially with its characters who are relatable laymen".

References

External links 

 Indian romantic drama films
2019 romantic drama films